Igatpuri railway station serves Igatpuri in Nashik district in the Indian state of Maharashtra.  It stands at the head of Thal Ghat.

It is a loco change-over point for trains moving out of Mumbai as well as trains entering Mumbai. The trains moving out of Mumbai usually change their locomotives to WAP-4 or WAP-7 or WAM-4 as the case may be. The trains entering Mumbai usually change their locomotives to WCAM-3. The station is famous for its Wada Pav and Idli.

History
Service up to Igatpuri was started in 1865.

Electrification
The Kalyan–Igatpuri section was electrified with 1.5 kV DC overhead system in 1929. Subsequent electrification with 25 kV AC overhead system in the Igatpuri–Manmad sector, with AC/DC change over at Igatpuri, was carried out in 1967–69. The change over of the Mumbai area from DC to AC is complete and AC/DC locomotives are converted to pure AC locomotives.

Busy station
130 trains (excluding Summer Special Trains) pass through Igatpuri (which also includes weeklies and biweeklies, etc.)

Electric trip sheds
Igatpuri has electric trip sheds, with separate sheds for AC locos.

Gallery 

 Trains at Igatpuri

References

Railway stations in Nashik district
Bhusawal railway division
Railway stations opened in 1865
1865 establishments in British India
Kalyan-Igatpuri rail line